Deathrealm was a Horror fiction magazine edited by Stephen Mark Rainey.  It won the International Horror Guild Award for best periodical in 1995.

References

External links
 Original Deathrealm Web site
 The Realm of Stephen Mark Rainey
 Delirium Books Web site

Horror fiction magazines